Clemente Gaddi (23 December 1901 – 7 November 1993) was an Italian prelate who was bishop of Bergamo in the years after the Second Vatican Council.

Life 

He was born in Mandello del Lario and ordained as a priest in 1926. From 1926 to 1953 he worked as professor of the seminary of Como and then prevost of Cernobbio.

In 1953, pope Pius XII named him bishop of Nicosia, and in 1962 pope John XXIII appointed him as Coadjutor archbishop of the Siracusa.

In 1963, after the death of bishop Giuseppe Piazzi he was named bishop of Bergamo with the personal title of Archbishop.

In 1977, he resigned from his post as bishop, and died in Bergamo where he is buried in the crypt of the Cathedral of Bergamo.

References

External links and additional sources
 (for Chronology of Bishops) 
 (for Chronology of Bishops) 

1901 births
1993 deaths
Bishops of Bergamo
20th-century Italian Roman Catholic archbishops
People from Mandello del Lario